Ryan Grant may refer to:

Ryan Grant (running back) (born 1982), American football running back in the National Football League 
Ryan Grant (rugby union) (born 1985), Scottish rugby union player
Ryan Grant (wide receiver) (born 1990), American football wide receiver in the National Football League

See also
Rhyan Grant (born 1991), Australian footballer